Elections in the Republic of India in 1997 included, the 1997 Punjab Legislative Assembly election, elections to seats in the Rajya Sabha and the elections to the posts of President and vice president.

Legislative Assembly elections

Punjab

|- align=center
!style="background-color:#E9E9E9" class="unsortable"|
!style="background-color:#E9E9E9" align=center|Political Party
!style="background-color:#E9E9E9" |No. of Candidates
!style="background-color:#E9E9E9" |Seats won
!style="background-color:#E9E9E9" |Number of Votes
!style="background-color:#E9E9E9" |% of Votes
|-
| 
|align="left"|Shiromani Akali Dal||92||75||38,73,099||37.64%
|-
| 
|align="left"|Bharatiya Janata Party||22||18||8,57,219||8.33%
|-
| 
|align="left"|Indian National Congress||105||14||27,36,346||26.38%
|-
| 
|align="left"|Communist Party of India||15||2||3,07,023||2.86%
|-
| 
|align="left"|Bahujan Samaj Party||67||1||7,69,675||6.37%
|-
| 
|align="left"|Shiromani Akali Dal (M)||30||1||3,19,111||3.10%
|-
| 
|align="left"|Independents||244||6||11,18,348||10.87%
|-
|
|align="left"|Total||693||117|| 1,02,89,814||
|-
|}

Rajya Sabha

President

Vice president

|- align=center
!style="background-color:#E9E9E9" class="unsortable"|
!style="background-color:#E9E9E9" align=center|Candidate
!style="background-color:#E9E9E9" |Party
!style="background-color:#E9E9E9" |Electoral Votes
!style="background-color:#E9E9E9" |% of Votes
|-
| 
|align="left"|Krishan Kant||align="left"|Janata Dal||441||61.76
|-
| 
|align="left"|Surjit Singh Barnala||align="left"|SAD||273||38.24
|-
| colspan="5" style="background:#e9e9e9;"|
|-
! colspan="3" style="text-align:left;"| Total
! style="text-align:right;"|714
! style="text-align:right;"|100.00
|-
| colspan="5" style="background:#e9e9e9;"| 
|-
|-
|colspan="3" style="text-align:left;"|Valid Votes||714||93.95
|-
|colspan="3" style="text-align:left;"|Invalid Votes||46||6.05
|-
|colspan="3" style="text-align:left;"|Turnout||760||96.20
|-
|colspan="3" style="text-align:left;"|Abstentions||30||3.80
|-
|colspan="3" style="text-align:left;"|Electors||790|| style="background:#e9e9e9;"|
|-
|}

References

External links
 

1997 elections in India
India
1997 in India
Elections in India by year